Acrocercops helicomitra is a moth of the family Gracillariidae, known from Brazil. It was described by Edward Meyrick in 1924. The hostplant for the species is Gossypium herbaceum.

References

helicomitra
Moths of South America
Moths described in 1924